Middle Fork Elk River is a  stream in Colorado.  It flows from a confluence of Gilpin Creek and Gold Creek in Routt National Forest north of Steamboat Springs to a confluence with the North Fork Elk River that forms the Elk River.

See also
 List of rivers of Colorado
 List of tributaries of the Colorado River

References

Rivers of Colorado
Rivers of Routt County, Colorado
Tributaries of the Colorado River in Colorado